Angela  Marie "Angie" Akers (née Harris; born June 30, 1976) is a retired professional beach volleyball player from the United States who played on the AVP Tour.  Akers was named the AVP Rookie of the Year in 2002.

Akers played NCAA indoor volleyball for the University of Notre Dame and is the school's all-time career ace and kills leader.  After graduating with a BA in Sociology, Akers played professional volleyball in Switzerland for three months.  Upon returning home, she decided to give up volleyball and pursue a running career.  Her highest accomplishment in running was finishing the 2001 Boston Marathon in 3 hours, 23 minutes.

Akers began her career in beach volleyball in 2002 after moving to Southern California from San Francisco, where she had been working at Lehman Brothers.  Since then, Akers has earned $252,127 in prize money and has consistently finished in the top ten in individual and team categories. In July 2007 with Brooke Hanson as her partner, the pair represented the U.S. at the Pan American Games in Rio de Janeiro, Brazil, and finished fifth. In 2009 with Tyra Turner as her partner, the duo finished 5th at the FIVB World Championships in Stavanger, Norway.

Akers was born and raised in Fort Wayne, Indiana, and attended Bishop Luers High School.  She is married to Jeremy Akers, a former professional football player.

References

External links
 
 
 

1976 births
Living people
Volleyball players from Indiana
American women's beach volleyball players
Pan American Games competitors for the United States
Beach volleyball players at the 2007 Pan American Games
Sportspeople from Fort Wayne, Indiana
21st-century American women
Notre Dame Fighting Irish women's volleyball players